The 2007 NCAA Division I baseball tournament was held from June 1 to 24, . Sixty-four NCAA Division I college baseball teams  advanced to the post season tournament after having played through a regular season, and for some, a conference tournament.

The 2007 tournament culminated with 8 teams advancing to the College World Series at historic Rosenblatt Stadium in Omaha, Nebraska, on June 15. Unseeded Oregon State repeated as national champions, winning all five of its games in the 2007 CWS.

Oregon State went undefeated through the College World Series, posting a 5–0 record. The Beavers, led by head coach Pat Casey, won all three games in their four-team bracket and then defeated North Carolina in two games in the best-of-three championship series.  Oregon State became the fifth team to win consecutive NCAA titles (last done by LSU in 1996-97), and were the first team to win four games in a CWS by six or more runs.  As of 2019, 2007 Oregon State remains the only team to have ever won at least four games by six or more runs in the same College World Series.  Their opener against Cal State Fullerton was a tight 3–2 victory, but OSU's last four games in the CWS were not close, impressive for a team seeded in the lower half of the 64-team tournament.

The Beavers also became the first team to win the CWS after having posted a losing conference record.  Oregon State was a disappointing 10–14 (.417) in the Pac-10, placing sixth among the nine baseball-playing schools (Oregon dropped baseball in 1981, but revived it in 2009.)

However, the Beavers' non-conference record during the regular season was an impressive 28–3 (.903), and as defending NCAA champions, just enough to gain a berth in the 64-team tournament.  They were placed as a No. 3 seed in one of the 16 four-team regionals, in Charlottesville, Virginia.  Oregon State responded by going 11–1 (.917) in the post season. Oregon State won their final 10 games to finish at 49–18 (.731) overall.  The Beavers trailed in only one inning of 2007 CWS: the first inning of the final game.  Their only loss in the post season came during the second game of regionals, where they fell in 13 innings to host Virginia.

Oregon State freshman pitcher Jorge Reyes (of Warden, Washington) was named the Most Outstanding Player of the 2007 CWS.  Reyes was 2–0 as a starter, defeating Cal State Fullerton in the opener and North Carolina in the first game of the finals.

Two elite programs from Louisiana, LSU and Tulane both failed to qualify for the field of 64, marking the first time since 1984 both schools stayed home. LSU reached the College World Series 13 times between 1986 and 2004, winning five national championships (1991, 1993, 1996, 1997, 2000), while Tulane made trips to the CWS in 2001 and 2005.

Bids

Automatic bids
Conference champions from 30 Division I conferences earned automatic bids to regionals.  The remaining 34 spots were awarded to schools as at-large invitees.

Bids by conference

National seeds
Bold indicates CWS participant.

North Carolina

Arizona State

Regionals and super regionals

Schedule
Regional rounds were held Friday, June 1, through Monday, June 4. Each regional followed a similar format, with two games played on Friday, Saturday, and Sunday, and one on Monday if needed (many regionals in the southern U.S. had their schedules adversely affected by rain)

Best-of-three super regionals were held Friday, June 8 through Monday, June 11. Four series were played Friday-Sunday and four series were played Saturday-Monday.

Bold indicates winner. * indicates extra innings.

Corvallis Super Regional
Hosted by Oregon State at Goss Stadium

Houston Super Regional
Hosted by Rice at Reckling Park

Chapel Hill Super Regional
Hosted by North Carolina at Boshamer Stadium

Wichita Super Regional
Hosted by Wichita State at Eck Stadium

Tempe Super Regional
Hosted by Arizona State at Packard Stadium

Starkville Super Regional
Hosted by Mississippi State at Dudy Noble Field

Louisville Super Regional
Hosted by Louisville at Jim Patterson Stadium

Fullerton Super Regional
Hosted by Cal State Fullerton at Goodwin Field

Tournament notes
 Albany, Brown, and Wofford were making their first NCAA tournament appearance.
Oregon State is one of only six teams (South Carolina: 2010-2011, LSU: 1996-1997, Stanford: 1987-1988, Southern California: 1970-1974, Texas: 1949-1950) to win consecutive CWS titles.
Oregon State is also the first team to repeat as champion since the CWS switched to the current 3-game championship series.
Oregon State is the first champion to make it back to the CWS the year after they won title since Texas appeared in the 2003 after winning it in 2002
The 2007 Oregon State Beavers are the first CWS champions with a conference record of less than .500 (10–14)
Louisville is the second school whose athletic teams have played in a Final Four, BCS bowl game, and a College World Series within the last three years.  Florida is the other school.
 2007 marks the 15th year in a row that the SEC has had at least one team make it to Omaha.
 2007 marks the second time the College World Series champions and runners-up are the same two consecutive years.

CWS records tied or broken
Oregon State became the first team to win four games by six or more runs in the CWS. As of 2021, 2007 Oregon State remains the final team to win four games by six or more runs in the CWS.
Oregon State became the first team to win the CWS while having a losing record in regular season conference play.
North Carolina's Rob Wooten pitched in a record 6 games in a single CWS.
North Carolina tied a CWS record by turning five double plays in game one of the final series against Oregon State.
North Carolina used a CWS record eight pitchers in its Game 6 loss to Rice.
Game 7 between UC-Irvine and Cal State-Fullerton went 13 innings and lasted 5 hours and 40 minutes. It was the longest game in terms of time in College World Series history. The game also had the most hit-by-pitches (eight) and reportedly used and lost 96 balls, the most ever. The previous record was 84 balls lost.
Louisville's Logan Johnson tied the CWS record with four home runs.
By beating Arizona State, UC-Irvine became the first team in CWS history to win two extra-inning games back to back.
A CWS record number of batters were hit by pitches during the series.

College World Series

Participants

Bracket

Championship series

Saturday 6/23

Game 14: 6:00 pm

Sunday 6/24

Game 15: 6:00 pm

All-Tournament Team
The following players were members of the All-Tournament Team.

Tournament performance by conference

References

NCAA Division I Baseball Championship
 
Baseball in Houston